Route nationale 1b (RN 1b) is a secondary highway in Madagascar of 94 km, running from Analavory to Tsiroanomandidy. It crosses the region of Bongolava and Itasy.

Selected locations on route
(east to west)
Analavory - (intersection with RN 1 from Antananarivo)
Ankadinondry Sakay (Babetville)
Tsinjoarivo
Tsiroanomandidy - (intersection with RN 1)

See also
List of roads in Madagascar
Transport in Madagascar

References

Roads in Itasy Region
Roads in Bongolava
Roads in Madagascar